National Socialist Industrial Workers Union (NSIAF) was the trade union wing of the National Socialist Workers Party (NSAP, later renamed the Swedish Socialist Union) in Sweden.

In 1938 NSIAF changed name to Swedish-Socialist Industrial Workers Union (Svensksocialistiska Industriarbetarförbundet, SSIAF). SSIAF was active during the hotel workers strike that year. It credited itself with having 30% higher subsidies to striking workers than the mainstream LO.

Later it changed name to Trade Union Struggle Organization of Sweden (Sveriges Fackliga Kamporganisation).

Trade unions in Sweden
Nazi Party organizations
Fascist trade unions